A list of films produced in Brazil in 2003 (see 2003 in film):

2003

See also
2003 in Brazil
2003 in Brazilian television

2003
Films
Brazil